is a railway station in the city of Shimoda, Shizuoka Prefecture, Japan, operated by the privately owned Izu Kyūkō Line .

Lines

Station layout
The station has one island platform serving two tracks, connected to the small station building by a level crossing. The station is unattended.

Platforms

Adjacent stations

History 
Inazusa Station was opened on December 10, 1961.

Passenger statistics
In fiscal 2017, the station was used by an average of 25 passengers daily (boarding passengers only).

Surrounding area
Inazusa Elementary School
Inazusa Middle School
Uehara Museum of Modern Art

See also
 List of Railway Stations in Japan

References

External links

 official home page.

Railway stations in Shizuoka Prefecture
Izu Kyūkō Line
Railway stations in Japan opened in 1961
Stations of Izu Kyūkō
Shimoda, Shizuoka